Mill Creek is a  tributary of the Juniata River in Huntingdon County, Pennsylvania in the United States. The waters of Mill Creek once powered watermills, hence the name.

Mill Creek joins the Juniata at the borough of Mill Creek.

Tributaries
Saddler Creek

See also
List of Pennsylvania rivers

References

Rivers of Pennsylvania
Rivers of Huntingdon County, Pennsylvania